This is a list of companies that manufacture elevators.

Current elevator manufacturers 

 Aichi small-elevator manufacturing corporation
 Doppler
 Fujitec 
 Hitachi 
 Hyundai Elevator
 Kone 
 Mitsubishi Electric
 Otis Elevator Company
 Saint-Gobain
 Schindler Group 
 Stannah Lifts
 Toshiba
 TK Elevator
 Walton Group

Former elevator manufacturers
 Dover Corporation: Elevator division acquired by Thyssen AG in 1999.
 Montgomery Elevator: Acquired by Kone, Canadian division in 1985 and U.S. division in 1994.
 Marshall Elevator: Sold to Otis
 Schweizerische Aufzügefabrik AG
 Thyssen AG: Merged with Krupp and became ThyssenKrupp in 1999, with subsidiary ThyssenKrupp Elevator AG
ThyssenKrupp Elevator AG announced in 2021 a name change and rebranding to TK Elevator
 Westinghouse: Elevator division bought by Schindler in 1989
 Anton Freissler –  invented and developed a number of paternoster and elevators. Incorporated into Otis

See also

 Lists of companies

References

External links 
 

Elevator